The volleyball competition at the 2021 Islamic Solidarity Games in Konya was organized between 8 August and 15 August 2022. The volleyball competition took place at Karatay Congress and Sport Center in Konya.

The Games were originally scheduled to take place from 20 to 29 August 2021 in Konya, Turkey. In May 2020, the Islamic Solidarity Sports Federation (ISSF), who are responsible for the direction and control of the Islamic Solidarity Games, postponed the games as the 2020 Summer Olympics were postponed to July and August 2021, due to the global COVID-19 pandemic.

Medalists

Medal table

Men

Preliminary round

Group A

|}

Group B

|}

Final round

Semifinals

|}

Bronze medal match

|}

Gold medal match

|}

Women

Preliminary round

Group A

|}

Group B

|}

Final round

Semifinals

|}

Bronze medal match

|}

Gold medal match

|}

References

External links
Official website of the men's tournament
Official website of the women's tournament

2021 Islamic Solidarity Games
Islamic Solidarity Games
2021
International volleyball competitions hosted by Turkey